The 2023 World Aquatics Championships, the 20th edition of the World Aquatics Championships, will be held in Fukuoka, Japan, between 14 to 30 July 2023. Originally scheduled to be held in 2021, the championships were postponed until May 2022 in response to the rescheduling of the 2020 Summer Olympics in Tokyo to 2021 due to the COVID-19 pandemic. The event was pushed back a second time to 2023 due to ongoing travel restrictions and safety measures in place in Japan. In its place, Budapest hosted the 19th Championships from 18 June to 3 July 2022. 

It will be the second time Fukuoka hosts this meet, 22 years after the 2001 World Aquatics Championships.

Host selection
The competitions originally were to be held in Budapest, Hungary, in the summer of 2021.  This was announced on 19 July 2013, on the biennial General Congress of FINA in Barcelona, the host-city of the 2013 World Aquatics Championships. Also Gwangju, South Korea, was awarded the 2019 Championships in the same vote.

However, in March 2015, it was announced that Budapest will host the 2017 Championships, after Guadalajara gave up the organization of the championships for financial reasons. A new bidding procedure was opened for the 2021 event.

On 9 June 2015, the FINA reported it had received expressions of interest for the 2021 and 2023 FINA World Championships from Argentina, Australia (with Melbourne or Sydney), China (with Wuhan or Nanjing), Germany (two potential cities), Japan, Turkey and Qatar. On 30 June 2015, an information meeting was organised for the nations and cities which had shown interest in bidding before. This meeting was attended by representatives of cities from six countries: Abu Dhabi (UAE), Buenos Aires (Argentina), Istanbul (Turkey), Nanjing (China), Fukuoka (Japan), Doha (Qatar).

On 31 January 2016, each of the bids was presented at a formal presentation to, and vote of, the FINA Bureau meeting in Budapest; then they announced that the host cities will be Fukuoka (2021) and Doha (2023).

Venues
Most of the competitions will be held at the Marine Messe, built for the 1995 Summer Universiade and same event in 2001, also hosted in Fukuoka.

 Marine Messe Fukuoka (swimming, artistic swimming and water polo)
 Kokusai Center (water polo)
 Fukuoka Prefectural Pool (diving)
 Boat Race Fukuoka (open water swimming, high diving)

Schedule
A total of 75 medal events will be held across six disciplines. The program returns to the traditional schedule with artistic swimming, diving, open water swimming and water polo all competing in the first week, while swimming and high diving get underway the following week.

Notes and references

External links
 Official website

2023
2023 in multi-sport events
World Championships, 2023
2023 in Japanese sport
Scheduled sports events
World Championships, 2023
Sports competitions in Fukuoka
Sports events postponed due to the COVID-19 pandemic
July 2023 sports events in Asia